Crassispira margaritula is an extinct species of sea snail, a marine gastropod mollusc in the family Pseudomelatomidae, the turrids and allies.

Subspecies 
 † Crassispira (Tripia) granulata guetaini (de Boury, 1899) 
 † Crassispira (Tripia) granulata herouvalensis (de Boury, 1899)

Distribution
Fossils of this extinct marine species were found in Eocene strata of the Paris Basin, France.

References

 Cossmann (M.) & Pissarro (G.), 1913 Iconographie complète des coquilles fossiles de l'Éocène des environs de Paris, t. 2, p. pl. 46-65
 Le Renard (J.) & Pacaud (J.-M.), 1995 Révision des Mollusques paléogènes du Bassin de Paris. 2 - Liste des références primaires des espèces. Cossmanniana, t. 3, vol. 3, p. 65-132

External links

 Pacaud J.M. & Le Renard J. (1995). Révision des Mollusques paléogènes du Bassin de Paris. IV- Liste systématique actualisée. Cossmanniana. 3(4): 151-187

granulata
Gastropods described in 1804